Perizaad Zorabian is an Indian actress. Her film debut was with Nagesh Kukunoor's Bollywood Calling and she gained international recognition for her role as Jenny in Subhash Ghai's Joggers' Park (2003).

Early life
Zorabian was born to an Irani Zoroastrian family in Maharashtra, India. She obtained a Master's in Business Administration at Baruch College and also attended the Lee Strasberg Theatre and Film Institute. She returned to India, and subsequently assisted her father in his poultry farm business, Zorabian Chicken.

Personal life
She married construction tycoon Boman Rustom Irani in 2006 and has 2 children.
She owns a restaurant "Gondola" in Mumbai. She has become the brand ambassador of the first Indian luxury fan brand Fanzart.  She was the emcee of the grand opening event of HIL's third edition. She was part of the 2013 TOIFA panel discussion, that discussed about the issues that women face across the globe.

Career
Zorabian's first screen appearance was in a Clearasil television advertisement, which she had made before she moved to New York. She continued with advertisements for health care products after her return to Mumbai, and, in 1997, acted in a music video for Lucky Ali's Nahi Rakhta Dil Mein Kuch.  She subsequently played "Maya" in the TV serial Hum Pardesi Ho Gaye.

Zorabian did a minor role in Mumbai Matinee (2003). In 2004, she played a supporting role in Morning Raga and made a cameo appearance in Dhoom. In 2005 she appeared in Ek Ajnabee opposite Kelly Dorjee, and a year later with Malcolm McDowell in Exitz. Her more recent films include Highway 203 (2006), Moonlight (2006), Just Married (2007) and Kabhi Up Kabhi Down. She has also acted in a Chinese film, Bandung Sonata, in which she played Indira Gandhi. From Bollywood she moved on to becoming a entrepreneur handling her family poultry business by the name "Zorabian Chicken" since 2008. Zorabian Chicken was awarded with "The Best Brands of India" award by Economic Times in the year 2019.

Filmography

Television Shows

Webseries

References

External links
 
 

Living people
Indian film actresses
Irani people
Parsi people
Indian restaurateurs
Year of birth missing (living people)